Ampanotokana is a town and commune in Madagascar. It belongs to the district of Ambohidratrimo (district), which is a part of Analamanga Region. The population of the commune was estimated to be approximately 21,969 in 2019.

Of the 29 fonkontany (villages) of the commune, 11 lie along the RN 4 from Antananarivo to Mahajanga. The RNT 36 intersects in this town.

Rivers
The Ikopa River is the southern limit of the commune.

References 

Populated places in Analamanga